Sorry About Dresden was an indie rock band from Chapel Hill, North Carolina. The band formed in 1997 and was signed to Saddle Creek Records.

Career
Combining elements of traditional alternative rock and punk rock, the band has drawn comparisons to Pavement, Superchunk, and the Archers of Loaf. The music’s sound is guitar-driven with a twangy, chiming feel.

Though they use political-historical references in a number of their song and album titles and in the name of the band itself (see Bombing of Dresden in World War II), Sorry About Dresden’s music is largely apolitical. Lyrics tend to be melancholy or about weather.

Sorry About Dresden has released three full-length albums, an EP, and has appeared on a number of compilations and finally found a home on Saddle Creek Records. The band’s first release was The Mayor Will Abdicate in 1999 under the independent label Route 14 Records.  This was followed by How the Cold War Began and The Convenience of Indecision, both released in 2001. 

Sorry About Dresden's biggest commercial success came by way of their fourth album Let it Rest with Saddle Creek Records, an Omaha-based label started by Justin Oberst, brother of the band’s guitarist (and co-singer) Matt Oberst. The other members of Sorry About Dresden are drummer James Hepler, singer/guitarist Eric Roehrig, and bassist Matt Tomich. Matt Oberst's younger brother, Conor Oberst of the popular indie act Bright Eyes, is also on the label.

Over the years Sorry About Dresden has made a name for itself on the college rock scene, mostly through word of mouth and favorable reviews in independent publications.

Singer and guitarist Matt Oberst died on November 27, 2016, at the age of 42.

The song "Ghost (Is Leaving Me)", recorded during "The Convenience Of Indecision" sessions, was released posthumously on October 22, 2021.

Discography

Albums
The Mayor Will Abdicate (1999) - Route 14 Records
The Convenience of Indecision (2001) - Saddle Creek Records 
Let it Rest (2003) - Saddle Creek Records

Singles
"Crusades"/"Me and Kim Il Sung" (1998) - Dude City Records
Sorry About Dresden/The White Octave 7" split ("What The Sea Left Behind Part 2" / "Felix Culpa") (2000) - Moment Before Impact Records
Rock School ("State You Hate", "Lachrymose/Obsequious/Vehement/Elated") (2000) - Moment Before Impact Records
Bright Eyes/Rilo Kiley/Sorry About Dresden 7" split ("Candid Camera") (2002) - Devil in the Woods Magazine Issue #55
Sorry About Dresden/Cold Sides 7" split ("Leviathan") (2003) - Sit n' Spin Records
Sorry About Dresden/The Jagular Drop 7" split (2006) - Horn Records
Ghost (Is Leaving Me) (2021)-Saddle Creek Records

EPs 

 How The Cold War Began (2001)-Moment Before Impact Records

Contributions and appearances
The Bridges of Dissonant County Vol. 1 ("What Gives You Butterflies?") (1998) - 2A Records
Pet Sounds Volume One: A Benefit For Alter ("My Universe") (1999) - Vital Cog Records
NE vs NC ("Some Precision") (2002) - The Redemption Recording CO.
Patchwork: A Compilation ("An Unmade Bed") (2002) - Mere Exposure 
Saddle Creek 50 ("Sick and Sore", "People Have Parties") (2002) - Saddle Creek Records 
I Am A Cold Rock. I Am Dull Grass: A Tribute to Will Oldham ("All Gone, All Gone") (2004) - Tract Records
Lagniappe: A Saddle Creek Benefit for Hurricane Katrina ("Sunrise: Norfolk, Virginia") (2005) - Saddle Creek Records 
Sing For Your Meat: A Tribute to Guided By Voices ("Echos Myron") (2011) - No More Fake Labels

References

External links
sorryaboutdresden.com
Sorry About Dresden Myspace
Saddle Creek Records
Lazy-i Interview: July 2003

Indie rock musical groups from North Carolina
Musical groups from Chapel Hill-Carrboro, North Carolina
Saddle Creek Records artists
Musical groups established in 1997
Musical groups disestablished in 2016